This is a list of contestants who have appeared on the reality television competition, The Voice Australia.

Notes
[1] Originally from Delta Goodrem's team.
[2] Originally from Joel Madden's team.
[3] Originally from Ricky Martin's team.
[4] Originally from Seal's team.

 
Voice (Australian TV series) contestants, The